The Lambert Baronetcy, of London, is a title in the Baronetage of Great Britain. It was created on 16 February 1711 for John Lambert, a French-born merchant who had settled in England. He was a Director of the South Sea Company and was created a Baronet for supplying the Treasury with loans. The seventh Baronet, who served as high sheriff of Worcestershire in 1901, assumed in 1905 by Royal licence the surname of Grey for himself and issue in lieu of his patronymic. This surname was also borne by the eighth Baronet.

Lambert baronets, of London (1711)
Sir John Lambert, 1st Baronet (1666–1723)
Sir John Lambert, 2nd Baronet (1690–1772)
Sir John Lambert, 3rd Baronet (1728–1799)
Sir Henry Lambert, 4th Baronet (c. 1756–1803)
Sir Henry John Lambert, 5th Baronet (1792–1858)
Sir Henry Edward Francis Lambert, 6th Baronet (1822–1872)
Sir Henry Foley Grey, 7th Baronet (1861–1914)
Sir John Foley Grey, 8th Baronet (1893–1938)
Sir Greville Foley Lambert, 9th Baronet (1900–1988) 
Sir John Hugh Lambert, 10th Baronet (c. 1908–1979) 
Sir Peter John Biddulph Lambert, 11th Baronet (born 1952) 
The heir apparent is Thomas Hugh John Lambert (born 1999)

References

Kidd, Charles, Williamson, David (editors). Debrett's Peerage and Baronetage (1990 edition). New York: St Martin's Press, 1990.

• pers.comm. P. Lambert (2010, 2017)

Lambert
1711 establishments in Great Britain